"Thug Cry" is a song by American hip hop recording artist Rick Ross, released on March 13, 2014 by Maybach, Slip-n-Slide, and Def Jam, as the 2nd and final official single from his sixth studio album Mastermind (2014).  The song was produced by J.U.S.T.I.C.E. League, written by Betty Idol and features a guest appearance by American rapper Lil Wayne, along with a hook performed by Betty Idol. The song has since peaked at number 37 on the US Billboard Hot R&B/Hip-Hop Songs chart. The sample comes from "Heather" by Billy Cobham (1974), which was previously used in songs such as "93 'til Infinity" by Souls Of Mischief (1993) and in "No Wheaties" by Big K.R.I.T., Smoke DZA & Curren$y (2010).

Release 
"Thug Cry" was serviced to mainstream urban radio in the United States on March 13, 2014 and then to rhythmic contemporary radio in the same country on April 1, 2014 as the third official single from his sixth studio album Mastermind.

Music video 
On May 5, 2014, the music video was released for "Thug Cry". The video follows a prisoner, played by actor Wood Harris, as he steps out of jail after serving time. Flashbacks reveal Harris' sentencing leading up to his prison sentence. The video then ends with Ross, Yo Gotti, and friends, welcoming Harris home, giving him a Rolls-Royce.

Chart performance

Certifications

References 

2014 singles
2014 songs
Rick Ross songs
Lil Wayne songs
Def Jam Recordings singles
Maybach Music Group singles
Songs written by Rick Ross
Songs written by Lil Wayne
Song recordings produced by J.U.S.T.I.C.E. League
Songs written by Erik Ortiz
Songs written by Kevin Crowe